Francesca Isabella Simon  (born 23 February 1955) is an American-born British author who resides in North London. She is most famous for writing the Horrid Henry series of children's books.

She is the daughter of screenwriter and playwright Mayo Simon (not to be confused with Simon Mayo, a British radio DJ).

Biography 
Simon was born in St. Louis, Missouri, U.S. She grew up in California and studied at Yale and Jesus College, Oxford, where she majored in medieval studies and Old English. Simon worked as a journalist, writing for the Sunday Times, Guardian, Mail on Sunday, The Daily Telegraph and Vogue (US).

Simon was inspired to write by Anthony Trollope. After she gave birth to her son, Joshua, in 1989, she began to write children's books full-time. Simon is one of the UK's best-selling children's writers; she has published over 50 different books, including her most popular series Horrid Henry series, which has sold over 25 million copies, and has been translated into 24 languages.

Simon lives in London with her husband, Martin, and her son. Their Tibetan spaniel, Shanti, is memorialized in the short story "Shanti" that Simon wrote for inclusion in the Paws and Whiskers anthology by fellow author Jacqueline Wilson published in February 2014.

In the spring of 2019 the Royal Opera House staged an opera based on Simon's book The Monstrous Child, about the Norse god of the dead, Hel, as an angry teenager. The opera is composed by Gavin Higgins with libretto by Simon.

Selected works

 Horrid Henry series, illustrated by Tony Ross, Orion Books, 1994 to 2015

  – longlisted for the Guardian Prize, 2014

Honours and awards
In 2008, Simon won the British Book Award for British Book Award The Children's Book of the Year with Horrid Henry and the Abominable Snowman. She is the first American to win this award.  Simon was awarded an MBE in the 2023 New Year Honours.

Simon was appointed Member of the Order of the British Empire (MBE) in the 2023 New Year Honours for services to literature.

References

External links
 
 
 

1955 births
Living people
Alumni of Jesus College, Oxford
American children's writers
American emigrants to England
Writers from St. Louis
Yale University alumni
Members of the Order of the British Empire
Naturalised citizens of the United Kingdom
British children's writers